James William Dickinson MBE (25 April 1925 – 8 November 1982) was an English footballer who played as a left half.

Dickinson holds the record for number of league appearances for Portsmouth (764). Only Swindon Town's John Trollope (770) has made more appearances for a single club.

He signed for Portsmouth as a trainee and made his debut in 1946 against Blackburn Rovers. Settling into the side quickly at either wing-half or left-half, he was part of the team that won successive league championships in 1948–49 and 1949–50. His performances earned him a call-up to the England national team. He went on to win 48 caps for England, making him Portsmouth's most capped English player of all time. During his record 845 club appearances for Pompey and his 48 England caps he was never once booked or sent off, earning him the nickname 'Gentleman Jim'.

As of 2022, he remains the only England player ever to have scored an own goal at the FIFA World Cup, scoring past his own goalkeeper in a 4–4 draw against Belgium in 1954.

Awarded the MBE for services to football in 1964, he played his last match for Pompey a year later, helping Pompey to a 1–1 end-of-season draw at Northampton Town that secured safety from relegation. And when he retired from playing, his association with the club continued. He served Pompey as public relations officer and then secretary before accepting the position of manager in May 1977. Relegation from the Third Division was avoided, but the next year Pompey dropped down a league.

After three heart attacks, Dickinson died aged 57 in 1982. The famous 'Pompey Chimes' were played in St Mary's Church in Fratton at a packed memorial service. He is buried in Alton Cemetery.

In 1998, he was included on the list of 100 Legends produced to celebrate the centenary of the Football League.

Dickinson's image can be seen in the seating in the Fratton End stand in Fratton Park.

In his home town of Alton there is a pub named The Gentleman Jim and Dickinson Road in Portsmouth was named in his honour.

Career statistics

References

External links

Dickinson's image in Fratton Park

1925 births
1982 deaths
England international footballers
English football managers
English footballers
1950 FIFA World Cup players
1954 FIFA World Cup players
Portsmouth F.C. managers
Portsmouth F.C. players
English Football League players
People from Alton, Hampshire
English Football League representative players
Association football wing halves
Members of the Order of the British Empire